Charles Glenn Howard (24 July 1897 in Indianapolis, Indiana – 29 March 1946) was an American racecar driver. He attempted the 1920 Indianapolis 500 but failed to qualify. He qualified for the 1922 race driving a Fronty-Ford. Those were his only two Championship Car appearances.

Howard died at the age of 49 in Trenton, Michigan of a heart attack.

Indianapolis 500 results

References

Indianapolis 500 drivers
1897 births
1946 deaths
Racing drivers from Indianapolis